Dragan Kojić, better known as Keba, is a Serbian singer.

Debuted in 1976, he has a career spanning more than four decades and remains one of the most acclaimed Serbian folk singers.

Kojić also appeared in the second season of the Serbian version of Your Face Sounds Familiar in 2014.

He is married and has two children, former singer Nataša Kojić and former footballer Igor Kojić.

Discography

Ponoćna zvona (1984)
Ako mi priđeš zaljubiću se (1986)
Život te otpiše (1987)
Zar za mene sreće nema (1989)
Plavo oko plakalo je (1990)
Srce piše suzama (1991)
Srce kuca tvoje ime (1992)
Sve ću tuge poneti sa sobom (1994)
Siromasi (1996)
Cveta trešnja (1998)
Me mangavla daje (2000)
Tiho noćas (2001)
Zapaliću pola grada (2002)
Bensedini (2004)
Sve na pesmu i veselje (2006)
Fer ubica (2013)

See also
Music of Serbia
Serbian folk music
Turbo-folk

References

1956 births
Living people
People from Loznica
20th-century Serbian male singers
Serbian turbo-folk singers
Grand Production artists
21st-century Serbian male singers